Per Fritzell, (born 2 October 1955) is a Swedish comedian and actor and member of the Galenskaparna och After Shave comedic group.

Biography 
He was born in Stockholm but grew up in Gothenburg. He studied at Chalmers University of Technology, and he ended up dropping out of the electro-technic class. In May 2012, he released his first solo album Jag tror inte på Gud, jag tror på Tomten. He presented an episode of Sveriges Radios show Sommar i P1 on 22 July 2014 talking about his life and career. Fritzell also participated in SVT's production Allsång på Skansen in the summer of 2020, in a duet with Victor Leksell, they sang Man ska ha husvagn.

Filmography
 Macken (1986) (TV series)
 The Castle Tour (1986)
 Leif (1987)
 En himla många program (1989) (TV series)
 Hajen som visste för mycket (1989)
 Macken – Roy's & Roger's Bilservice (1990) 
 Stinsen brinner... filmen alltså (1991)
 Tornado (1993) (TV series)
 Rederiet (1994) (TV series) 
 En på miljonen (1995)
 Monopol (1996)
 Åke från Åstol (1998)
 Mitt i livet (1999)
 Gladpack (2000)
  Lejonkungen 3 – Hakuna Matata (voice of Timon) (2004)
 Den enskilde medborgaren (2006)
 Hoppet (2007)
 Playa del sol (2009)
 Hälsningar från (2018) (TV series)

References

Living people
1955 births
Swedish male comedians
Swedish male film actors
Swedish male television actors
Swedish male singers
Swedish male musical theatre actors
Male actors from Stockholm
Galenskaparna och After Shave members
20th-century Swedish comedians
21st-century Swedish comedians